Valentín González Avila (born 21 May 1910, date of death unknown) was a Mexican long-distance runner. He competed in the 5000 metres at the 1932 Summer Olympics and the 1936 Summer Olympics.

References

1910 births
Year of death missing
Athletes (track and field) at the 1932 Summer Olympics
Athletes (track and field) at the 1936 Summer Olympics
Mexican male long-distance runners
Olympic athletes of Mexico
Place of birth missing
20th-century Mexican people